There have been four baronetcies  created for people with the surname Hoare, one in the Baronetage of Ireland, one in the Baronetage of Great Britain and two in the Baronetage of the United Kingdom. The second holder of the third creation was raised to the peerage as Viscount Templewood in 1944.

The Hoare baronetcy, of Annabella in the County of Cork, was created in the Baronetage of Ireland on 10 December 1784 for Joseph Hoare. He represented Askeaton in the Irish House of Commons for many years and voted against the Act of Union in 1800 at the age of over 90. The second baronet sat as a member of the Irish Parliament for Carlow.

The Hoare baronetcy, of Barn Elms in the County of Surrey, was created in the Baronetage of Great Britain on 27 June 1786 for Richard Hoare. He was the son of Sir Richard Hoare, Lord Mayor of London in 1745, and the great-grandson of Sir Richard Hoare, Lord Mayor of London in 1712 and the founder of the banking firm of C. Hoare & Co. The fifth baronet sat as a Liberal member of parliament for Windsor and Chelsea. The family seat was Stourhead in Wiltshire until 1946, and is now Luscombe Castle, Dawlish, Devon, England.

The Hoare baronetcy, of Sidestrand Hall in the County of Norfolk, was created in the Baronetage of the United Kingdom on 7 August 1899. For more information on this creation, see Viscount Templewood.

The Hoare baronetcy, of Fleet Street in the City of London, was created in the Baronetage of the United Kingdom on 6 December 1962 for Frederick Alfred Hoare. The title became extinct on his death in 1986.

Hoare baronets, of Annabella (1784)
Sir Joseph Hoare, 1st Baronet (1707–1801)
Sir Edward Hoare, 2nd Baronet (1745–1814)
Sir Joseph Wallis Hoare, 3rd Baronet (1773–1852)
Sir Edward Hoare, 4th Baronet (1801–1882)
Sir Joseph Wallis O'Bryen Hoare, 5th Baronet (1828–1904)
Sir Sydney James O'Bryen Hoare, 6th Baronet (1860–1933)
Sir Edward O'Bryen Hoare, 7th Baronet (1898–1969)
Sir Timothy Edward Charles Hoare, 8th Baronet (1934–2008)
Sir Charles James Hoare, 9th Baronet CStJ (born 1971); educated at Pimlico School followed by Durham University (BA, History) and the London School of Economics (MSc, Voluntary Sector Management and Social Policy). Employed by Christian Action Research and Education (1998–2012) and now an independent consultant on public policy, especially on matters concerning religion. Married 2000 The Hon Eleanor Filumena, dau. of Michael Llowarch Warburton Flower, 11th Viscount Ashbrook. Heir apparent is Edward Harry William Hoare esq. (born 2006)

Hoare baronets, of Barn Elms (1786)
Sir Richard Hoare, 1st Baronet (1735–1787)
Sir Richard Colt Hoare, 2nd Baronet (1758–1838)
Sir Henry Hugh Hoare, 3rd Baronet (1762–1841)
Sir Hugh Richard Hoare, 4th Baronet (1787–1857)
Sir Henry Ainslie Hoare, 5th Baronet (1824–1894)
Sir Henry Hugh Arthur Hoare, 6th Baronet (1865–1947)
Sir Peter William Hoare, 7th Baronet (1898–1973)
Sir Peter Richard David Hoare, 8th Baronet (1932–2004)
Sir David John Hoare, 9th Baronet (born 1935)

Hoare baronets, of Sidestrand Hall (1899)
See the Viscount Templewood

Hoare baronets, of Fleet Street (1962)
Sir Frederick Alfred Hoare, 1st Baronet (1913–1986)

Gallery

References

Baronetcies in the Baronetage of Ireland
Baronetcies in the Baronetage of Great Britain
Extinct baronetcies in the Baronetage of the United Kingdom
1784 establishments in Ireland
1786 establishments in Great Britain
1899 establishments in the United Kingdom